An Assisted Elopement is a 1912 silent film short directed by Colin Campbell. It was produced by Selig Polyscope Company. The film is preserved in the Library of Congress collection.

Cast
Frank Clark - Old Robert Wilson (*billed Frank M. Clark)
Elmer Clifton - Young Tom Richmond
Betty Harte - Jeanette Wilson
Al Ernest Garcia - Brown, Tom's Friend (*as Al E. Garcia)
Frank Richardson - Captain Baker
James Robert Chandler - The Parson (*as Robert Chandler)
Blanche McCormick - Dot, Jeanette's friend

References

External links
An Assisted Elopement at IMDb.com

1912 films
American silent short films
Selig Polyscope Company films
Films directed by Colin Campbell
1912 short films
1912 drama films
1910s American films